Hanbo may refer to:
 Hanbo Steel, a South Korean company most prominent for the 1997 Hanbo scandal (Hanbogate)
 Hanbo Securities, original name of South Korean company NH Investment & Securities
 Hanbō, a staff used in martial arts
 Hanbō, a kind of men-yoroi (Japanese facial armour)

People with the name Hanbo include:
Wang Xihou (1713–1777), courtesy name Hanbo, Chinese scholar executed by the Qing Dynasty
Li Hanbo (born 1991), Chinese football midfielder

See also
Hambo, a Swedish dance